An antidote is a substance which can counteract a form of poisoning.

Antidote, Antidotes or The Antidote may also refer to:

Music

Groups and labels
 Antidote (band), punk band from the Netherlands formed in 1996
 Antidote, a 1980s New York hardcore punk band that featured Drew Stone and Arthur Googy
 Antidote Records, UK independent record label
 Antidote Shanghai, group of music producers and DJs in China
 Antidote, a collaboration of Dutch band The Ex and UK band Chumbawamba for their 1987 7-inch EP Destroy Fascism!
 Hot Rod Circuit, emo band from Alabama that originally formed under the name "Antidote"

Albums
 Antidotes (album), 2008 release by Foals
 The Antidote (Benzino album), 2007
 Antidote (Chick Corea album)
 The Antidote (Fashawn album), 2009
 The Antidote (Indo G and Lil' Blunt album), 1995
 The Antidote (Ronny Jordan album), 1992
 The Antidote (Moonspell album), 2003
 The Antidote (Morcheeba album), 2005
 The Antidote (The Wiseguys album), 1999
 Soundpieces: Da Antidote, 1999 album by Lootpack

Songs
 "Antidote" (Swedish House Mafia song), a 2011 song by Swedish House Mafia vs. Knife Party
 "Antidote" (Travis Scott song), 2015
 "Antidote", a 2000 song by Cameo Sexy Sweet Thing
 "Antidote", a 1999 song by The Fall from their album The Marshall Suite
 "Antidote" (Kang Daniel song), a 2021 song by Kang Daniel from his EP Yellow
 "The Antidote", a 2022 song by Simple Plan from their album Harder Than It Looks
 "The Antidote", a 2008 song by Story of the Year from their album The Black Swan

Other uses
 Antidote Films, a New York independent film company
 "The Antidote", a 1978 episode of The Bionic Woman
 The Antidote: Happiness for People Who Can't Stand Positive Thinking, a 2012 book by Oliver Burkeman
 "The Antidote", nickname of Mark Coleman, wrestler and mixed martial artist
 Antidote (software), writing assistance software by the Canadian company Druide informatique